This is a List of Pakistani dramas. The programs are organised alphabetically.

A

 Aahista Aahista (2014, Hum TV)
 Aanchal  (PTV)
 Aangan Terha (1980s, PTV)
 Aangan (2018, Hum TV) 
 Aangan (2017, ARY Digital)
 Aansoo (2000, PTV)
 Aao Laut Chalein (2017, Geo Entertainment)
 Aap ki Kaneez (2015, Geo Entertainment)
 Aashti (2009, Hum TV)
 Aasmanon Pay Likha (2013, Geo TV)
 Aatish (2018, Hum TV)
 Ab Dekh Khuda Kya Karta Hai (2018, Geo Entertainment)
 Adhi Gawahi (2017, Hum TV)
 Adhoora Bandhan (Geo Entertainment)
 Adhoori Aurat (2013, Geo TV)
 Ahmed Habib Ki Betiyan (2011, Hum TV)
 Aik Nayee Cinderella (2012, Geo TV)
 Aik Thi Raniya (Geo Entertainment)
 Aik Pal (2014, Hum TV)
 Aik Thi Misaal (2015, Hum TV)
 Ainak Wala Jin (1993–96, PTV)
 Aisi Hai Tanhai (2017, ARY Digital)
 "Ajaib Khana" (1996, PTV Home)
 Akbari Asghari (2011, Hum TV)
 Akhri Barish (2011, Hum TV)
 Aks (2011, Hum TV)
 Aks (2012, ARY Digital)
 Ali Ki Ammi (2015, Geo Entertainment)
 Alif (Geo Entertainment)
 Alif Allah Aur Insaan (2017, Hum TV)
 Alif Noon (1980s, PTV)
 Alpha Bravo Charlie (1998, PTV)
 Alvida (2015, Hum TV)
 Amma Aur Gulnaz (Geo Entertainment)
 Ana (Geo Entertainment)
 Anaya Tumhari Hui (2015, Geo TV)
 Angar Wadi (1994, PTV)
 Ankahi (1982, PTV)
 Anokha Ladla (2011, PTV)
 Aseerzadi (2013, Hum TV)
 Ashk (2012, Geo TV)
 Aunn Zara (2013, A-Plus Entertainment)
 Aye Dil Tu Bata 
 Aik Hai Nigar 
 Aakhri Station 
 Aitebaar

B

 Baaghi (2017, Urdu 1)
 Baba Jani (2018, Geo Entertainment)
 Baityaan (2009, Hum TV)
 Balaa(2018, ARY Digital)
 Band Khirkiyan
 Bandhan
 Bandhay Aik Dor Say (2020, Geo Entertainment)
 Bandish (2019, ARY Digital)
 Bari Apa
 Barson Baad
 Bashar Momin
 Bay Dardi
 Bay Khudi
 Bay Qasoor
 Bedardi Saiyaan (Geo Entertainment)
 Behkawa (Geo Entertainment)
 Belapur Ki Dayan
 Besharam
 Beti
 Bezuban (TV series)
 Bharosa Pyar Tera
 Bholi Bano (2017, Geo Entertainment)
 Bhool
 Bikhra Mera Naseeb (Geo Entertainment)
 Bilqees Kaur
 Bin Roye
 Bojh (Geo Entertainment)
 Bol Meri Machli (Geo Entertainment)
 Boota from Toba Tek Singh
 Bulbulay
 Bunty I Love You
 Banno
 Beqadar
 Badshah Begum
 Bichoo

C

 Chaand Parosa (Geo Entertainment)
 Chain Aye Na (Geo Entertainment)
 Challenger
 Chandni
 Cheekh (2019, ARY Digital)
 Chemistry (2010, Geo Entertainment)
 Chupke Chupke (2021, HUM TV)
 Chup Raho (2014, ARY Digital)
 Coke Kahani (2012, syndicated)
 College
 Chaudhry and Sons (2022– )(Geo Entertainment)

D

 Daagh
 Daam 
 Daasi  
 Daddy
 Daldal
 Dar Si Jaati Hai Sila
 Daray Daray Naina
 Darr Khuda Say
 Dasht
 Dastaan
 Dastar
 De Ijazat Jo Tu
 De Ijazat
 Deemak (Geo Entertainment)
 Deewangi (Geo Entertainment)
 Dekho Chaand Aaya (Geo Entertainment)
 Dhaani (Geo Entertainment)
 Dharkan (2016)
 Dhoop Kinarey
 Dhundle Raste
 Dhuwan
 Digest Writer
 Dil e Muztar
 Dil Ishq (Geo Entertainment)
 Dil Kiya Karay (Geo Entertainment)
 Dil Lagi
 Dil Mom Ka Diya
 Dil Muhallay Ki Haveli (Geo Entertainment)
 Dil Tou Bhatkay Ga (Geo Entertainment)
 Dil-e-Beqraar (2016)
 Dilfareb (Geo Entertainment)
 Dil e Nadan (Geo Entertainment)
 Dil Hai Chota Sa (Geo Entertainment)
 Dil Nawaz (A Plus TV)
 Din (PTV)
 Diyar-e-Dil
 Do Bol
 Do Qadam Door Thay (Geo Entertainment)
 Dobara
 Doosri Biwi
 Doraha (Geo Entertainment)
 Duaa (Geo Entertainment)
 Dugdugi
 Dulhan
 Durr-e-Shehwar
 Dushman-e-Jaan
 Deewar-E-Shab
 Dil Ruba
 Dil Awaiz
 Dikhawa
 Dil Tera Hogaya
 Daadi Ka Daamad

E

 Ehd-e-Wafa
 Ek Hatheli Pe Hina Ek Hatheli Pe Lahoo (Geo Entertainment)
 Ek Kasak Reh Gayi (Geo Entertainment)
 Ek Nazar Meri Taraf (Geo Entertainment)
 Ek Tamanna Lahasil Si

F

 Family Front
Fitoor
Fitrat
 Firaaq
 Faryad
Fatah

Fraud

G

 Ghaao (Geo Entertainment)
 Ghar Titli Ka Par (Geo Entertainment)
 Ghazi Shaheed
 Gohar-e-Nayab
 Goya
 Gul-e-Rana
 Gul-o-Gulzar
 Guzaarish
 Ghalati
 Ghissi Pitti Mohabbat
 Gard
 Ghar
 Ghar Aik Nagar
 Ghar Ghaliyan Aur Raastey
 Ghulam Gardish
 Gul Bashra
 Gulls & Guys

H

 Haara Dil (A Plus dramas)
 Haiwan
 Heer Ranjha
 Hum Tehray Gunahgaar
 Humnasheen
 Humsafar
 Hasad
 Hum Tum
 Hum Kahan Kay Sachay Thay

I

 I-Techie
 Iffet
 Isabel
 Ishq
 Ishq Gumshuda
 Ishq Hamari Galiyon Mein
 Ishq Ibadat
 Ishq Jalebi
 Ishq Junoon Deewangi
 Ishq Mein Kaafir
 Ishq Mein Teray 
 Ishq Nachaya
 Ishq Tamasha
 Ishq Zahe Naseeb
 Ishq Ne Ki Wafa
 Inkaar
 Ishqiya
 Izteraab
 Iltija
 Ishq Hai
 Intezaar (TV series)
 Inteha e Ishq
 Inteqam
 Ibn-e-Hawwa
 Ishq-e-Laa

J

 Jaan'nisar
 Jab We Wed
 Jackson Heights
 Jal Pari
 Jalebiyan
 Jhoot
 Jhoothi
 Jugnoo
 Judai
 Jaane Anjaane

K

 Kabhi Kabhi
 Kadoorat
 Kafir
 Kahani Raima Aur Manahil Ki
 Kahi Unkahi
 Kahin Deep Jaley
 Kaisa Hai Naseeban
 Kankar
 Karadayi
 Karb
 Karuroon Ka Aadmi (PTV) (1998)
 Kash Mein Teri Beti Na Hoti
 Kashf
 Kashkol
 Kathputli (2016)
 Khaali Haath
 Khaani
 Khaas
 Khasara
 Khamoshi
 Khatti Meethi Zindagi
 Khoya Khoya Chand
 Khuda Dekh Raha Hai
 Khuda Ki Basti
 Khuda Mera Bhi Hai
 Khudgarz
 Khushi Ek Roag
 Khwaab Ankhain Khwahish Chehre
 Ki Jaana Main Kaun
 Kis Din Mera Viyah Howay Ga
 Kis Ki Ayegi Baraat series (2009–2012)
 Annie ki Ayegi Baraat (2012)
 Azar Ki Ayegi Baraat (2009)
 Dolly Ki Ayegi Baraat (2010)
 Takkay ki Ayegi Baraat (2011)
 Kitna Satatay Ho
 Koi Chand Rakh
 Kuch Kar Dikha
 Khudparast
 Khuda Aur Mohabbat
 Khuda Aur Mohabbat
 Khuda Aur Mohabbat 3
 khan
 Kasa-e-Dil
 Kuch Pyar Ka Pagalpan Bhi Tha

L

 Ladoon Mein Pali
 Laag
 Ladies Park
 Lagaao
 Landa Bazar
 Loose Talk
 Laal Ishq (A-Plus)
 Lamhay
 Lashkara
 Love Siyappa

M

 Main Khayal Hoon Kisi Aur Ka
 Maat
 Madiha Maliha
 Mah-e-Tamaam
 Main Abdul Qadir Hoon
 Main Chand Si
 Main Gunehgar Nahi
 Main Manto
 Malaal
 Malangi (PTV)
 Malika-e-Aliya
 Manay Na Ye Dil
 Mann Ke Moti
 Mann Mayal
 Mannchalay
 Mata-e-Jaan Hai Tu
 Mar Jain Bhi To Kya
 Marasim
 Marvi
 Maryam
 Mastana Mahi
 Mausam
 Meer Abru
 Mehar Bano aur Shah Bano
 Mehar Posh
 Mehmoodabad Ki Malkain
 Mehndi
 Mein Hari Piya
 Mere Humsafar (TV series)'
 Mera Naam Yousuf Hai Mera Naseeb Mera rab waris Mera Saaein Mera Saaein 2 Mera Yaqeen Mere Harjai Mere Qatil Mere Dildar Mere Humdum Mere Dost Mere Meherbaan Meray Paas Tum Ho Meri Behan Maya Meri Behan Meri Dewrani Meri Dulari Meri Ladli Meri Maa Meri Saheli Meri Humjoli Meri Zaat Zarra-e-Benishan Meri Zindagi Hai Tu Mera Kya Qasoor Tha Mera Qasoor Mil Ke Bhi Hum Na Mile Mirat Ul Uroos Mishaal Mohabbatein chahatein (HUM TV)
 Mohabat Subh Ka Sitara Hai Mohabbat Jaye Bhar MeinMohabbat Tumse Nafrat Hai Mohabbat Rooth Jaye Toh Mohabbat Tujhe Alvida Mol Muhabbat Ab Nahi Hugi Mujhay Roothnay Na Daina Mujhay Sandal Kar Do Mujhe Khuda Pe Yaqeen Hai Munkir Muqabil Mushk MushrikMaana Ka GharanaMujhe Jeene DoMere Bewafa Mera Yaar Milade Malaal-E-Yaar Muhabbat Na Kariyo Meray Humnasheen Mohlat Mera Pehla PyaarN

 Na Kaho Tum Mere Nahi Naagin Nadamat Nail Polish Namak Paray Nanhi Neelam Ghar Neeyat Nibah Nijaat Nikhar Gaye Gulab Sare Noor Bano Noor Pur Ki Rani NummO

 Omer Dadi Aur Gharwale O RangrezaP

 Pakistan Idol Pani Jaisa Piyar Parsa Pathjar Ke Baad Peer e Kamil Phaans Phir Chand Pe Dastak Pyaray Afzal Pukaar (2018, ARY Digital)
 Purfume Chowk Pagli Parchayee Parchaiyan Piya Ka Ghar Piyara Lage Pyar Ke Sadqay Prem Gali Pehli si Muhabbat Paristaan ParizaadQ

 Qaid-e-Tanhai Qayamat Quddusi Sahab Ki Bewah Qurban Qurbatain Qaid Qismat (2019, Hum TV)

R

 Rabba Mainu Maaf Kareen Raju Rocket Rang Mahal Rani Rehaai Riyasat Ru Baru Rubber Band Ranjha Ranjha Kardi Ready Steady Go Romeo Weds Heer Roshan Sitara Ruswai  Ruposh (telefilm) Raaz-e-Ulfat(drama) Rasmeduniya RoagS

 Saat Pardon Mein Saaya Sabaat Sadqay Tumhare Saiqa Samjhauta Express Sammi Sang-e-Mar Mar Sangat Sangsar Sanjha Saari Bhool Hamari Thi  Seep (TV drama)  
 Shab e Gham Shanakht Shehnai Shehr-e-Zaat Shehrnaz Shehzori Shert Sinf-e-Aahan Shiza Shukk Silsilay (Geo Entertainment)
 Sitamgar Sun Yaara Susraal Mera Sona Chandi Stop watch Suno Chanda Suno Chanda 2 Susraal Mera Surkh Jorra Surkh Chandni "Sirriyan"
 Shahrukh Ki Saliyan Sada Suhagan Sang-e-MahT

 Tabeer Tajdeed-e-wafa Taana Baana 
 Tarap Tawaan Tere Mere Beech Thora sa haq 
 Tumhare Siwa  Tumhari Natasha Tum Ho Wajah Talafi Teri Meri Love Story Tumse Mil KayU

 Udaari Uff Yeh Mohabbat Ullu Baraye Farokht Nahi Uncle Urfi Uraan (2010 TV series)
 Uraan (2020 TV series)
 Uss PaarV

 Vasl VisaalW

 Waris Woh Woh Dobara Wilco Woh Aik Pal Waada Woh Mera Dil ThaY

 Yaqeen Ka Safar Yariyan Yeh Dil Mera Yeh Zindagi Hai Yeh Raha DilZ

 Zaakham Zara Yaad Kar Zard Mausam Zaib un Nisa Zebaish (HUM TV)
 Zeenat Bint-e-Sakina Hazir Ho Zid Zindagi Dhoop Tum Ghana Saya Zindagi Gulzar Hai Zip Bus Chup Raho''

References

External links
 Pakistani dramas on IMdb
 Pakistani dramas rating

Pakistani television series
Pakistan
Series